Rebelde is the debut studio album by Mexican Latin pop vocal group RBD, released on November 30, 2004, in Mexico and on January 11, 2005, in the United States and the rest of Latin America.

The album belongs to the pop and latin pop genres, with teen pop and pop rock stylings. The album was produced by Carlos Lara, Max di Carlo and Armando Ávila. A Brazilian Portuguese version of the album was also recorded and released on November 1, 2005. On March 2, 2006, a 'Diamond Edition' of the album was also released.

In the United States the album topped the Billboard Latin Pop Albums chart, while reaching the runner-up slot in the main Billboard Top Latin Albums chart and selling over 400,000 copies in the country, attaining 4× platinum certification. The album reached the top spot in the music charts of Mexico, selling 550,000 copies there and gaining a diamond and gold certification by AMPROFON.

As part of the album's promotion, four singles were released.  The first three, "Rebelde", "Solo Quédate En Silencio", and "Sálvame", became number one hits in Mexico.

The album has sold over 1,5 million copies worldwide in the first two years of release and was the tenth best selling EMI album of 2006.

Background and recording 
In 2004, filming began on the Mexican telenovela Rebelde; its six main young actors Maite Perroni, (Anahí, Alfonso Herrera, Dulce María], Christopher Uckermann Christian Chávez and  would go on to form the musical group RBD, having their first studio album released on November 30, 2004, in Mexico. The album had its vocals recorded in just two days, as stated by the members of RBD themselves. RBD's six vocalists sung all of the album's 11 songs in the studios of two of the album's producers: Armando Ávila and Carlos Lara. The album was executive produced by renowned Mexican television producer Pedro Damián. The album was later released on January 11, 2005, in the United States and the rest of Latin America.

Promotion

Singles 

As part of the album's promotion, starting September 2004, four singles were released. The lead single off the album, "Rebelde", was released on September 30, 2004, and reached  1 on the Mexican charts. The second single was "Solo Quédate en Silencio", which after being released on December 2, 2004, also became a number one hit in Mexico. The third single was the ballad "Sálvame", which was named the most-played song on Mexican radio in 2005. The song has singer Anahí performing its main vocals while the rest of the band sings the chorus. The single was released March 15, 2005. The fourth and last single from the album  was "Un Poco De Tu Amor", which was released on July 4, 2005, only to Mexican radio. The album's singles were used as part of the telenovela's soundtrack, with lead single "Rebelde" becoming the TV show's main theme.

Three music videos were filmed to promote the singles "Rebelde", "Solo Quédate En Silencio", and "Sálvame", and were all directed by Pedro Damián. Aside from the album's four official singles, 2 other songs from the album had radio promotion: "Otro Día Que Va" and "Enséñame".

Tour 

RBD's first national tour, Tour Generación RBD, sold out every single date. The group offered 35 concerts in Mexico, starting January 3, 2005, and ending August 28, 2005 in the Auditorio Nacional. On October 21, 2005, an expanded international leg for the tour led the group to visit Colombia for the first time. This was soon followed with first visits to Venezuela, Puerto Rico and Ecuador, experimenting the same level of success in these countries as in the band's native Mexico.

Commercial performance 
The album went on to be certified diamond and gold in Mexico, shipping 550,000 copies and topping the Mexican Albums Chart for twelve non-consecutive weeks. Due to the success of the Spanish language album, the band recorded a Portuguese language version of Rebelde for their growing fanbase in Brazil, titled Rebelde (Edição Brasil). RBD became the first foreign act in Brazil to have two albums in different languages (Portuguese and Spanish) in the top ten of the Brazilian Albums Chart at the same time, with both albums reaching number one. In 2006, the original Spanish-language version of the album was also released in Spain. RBD eventually topped the Spain Albums Chart with their debut album for five consecutive weeks. The album also spent more than 50 weeks in the Billboard Top Latin Albums chart in the United States, peaking at number two and spending over 2 months in the chart's top 5, selling over 400,000 copies in the country and being certified 4× platinum (Latin field) by the RIAA. Worldwide, the album went on to sell more than 1,500,000 copies.

Track listing

Personnel
Credits adapted from the album's liner notes.

Performance credits
RBD – All vocals, background vocals
Güido Laris – background vocals

Instruments
Armando Ávila – all instruments, background vocals
Max di Carlo – all instruments

Production

Camilo Lara –  A&R
Melissa Mochulske –  A&R coordination
Güido Laris –  arrangement, vocal producer
Carlos Lara –  background vocal arrangement, producer
René Cárdenas, Juan Carlos Moguel –  engineers
Pedro Damián –  executive producer
Luis Luisillo Miguel –  associate producer
hulahula.com.mx –  graphic design
Marisol Alcelay –  marketing
Max di Carlo –  mixer, producer, vocal producer, arrangement, programming
Migliano Paglinio  –  additional musician
Gib Taylor – additional musician
Ramoncín Sosa – additional musician
Emilio Ávila –  production coordinator
Jorge González  –  production assistant
Armando Ávila –  song translation to Spanish, producer
Michkin Boyzo – song translation to Spanish, recording assistant
Ricardo Trabulsi –  photographer

Awards

Charts

Weekly charts

Year-end charts

Certifications

Release history

See also
List of best-selling albums in Mexico
List of best-selling albums in Brazil

Notes

RBD albums
2004 debut albums
2005 albums
Articles containing video clips